The Canary melon (Cucumis melo (Inodorus group)) or winter melon  is a large, bright-yellow elongated melon with a pale green to white inner flesh.

This melon has a distinctively sweet flavor that is slightly tangier than a honeydew melon. The flesh looks like that of a pear but is softer. When ripe, the rind has a slightly waxy feel. The name comes from its bright yellow color, which resembles that of the canary. This melon is often marketed as the Juan Canary melon and can be found in various sizes and shapes. This melon is common in parts of Asia, e.g., Japan and South Korea, Algeria and Morocco.
Varieties include the smaller, round Fonzy melon, cultivated in Mexico. Canary melon has a subtly sweet flavor to it.

They are best stored at 15 °C (59 °F).

See also 
 List of culinary fruits
 Melon

References

Melons